This is an article about the events of heavy metal in the year 1988.

Newly formed bands 
16volt
Abramelin
Acheron
The Almighty
 Amon Amarth (known as Scum until 1992)
Anal Cunt
Ancient Rites
Asphalt Ballet
Asrai
Atrox
Axxis
Babylon A.D.
Badlands
Bang Tango
The Big F
Broken Hope
 Cadaver
Cancer
 Cannibal Corpse
Carbonized
 Carnage
Circle of Dust
Cold as Life
Convulse
Cripple Bastards
Cryptopsy
Deftones
Depressive Age
Desaster
Desperado
 Dismember
Divididos
Dizzy Mizz Lizzy
Electric Boys
Epizod
Expulsion
 Eyehategod
Fudge Tunnel
God Macabre
Goreaphobia
Inquisition
Integrity
Iron Man
Kik Tracee
Killing Time
Kong
La Renga
Mägo de Oz
Mother Love Bone
 Mr. Big
Naked City
 Nine Inch Nails
Nirvana 2002
Nitro
Opera IX
 Paradise Lost
Psychotic Waltz
 Pungent Stench
Rhino Bucket
Sacred Warrior
Saigon Kick
Shihad
Sinister
 The Smashing Pumpkins
Soilent Green
Solitude Aeturnus
Sorcerer
Soziedad Alkoholika
Suffocation
Tad
Threshold
Tin Machine
Unanimated
Unholy
Vital Remains
White Skull
Winter
Xysma

Albums & EPs 

 AC/DC – Blow Up Your Video
 ADX – Exécution Publique
 Acid Reign – Moshkinstein (EP)
 Acrophet – Corrupt Minds
 Agony – The First Defiance
 Anacrusis – Suffering Hour
 Angel Dust – To Dust Will You Decay
 Anthem – Gypsy Ways
 Anthrax – State of Euphoria
 Anvil – Pound for Pound
 Apocalypse – Apocalypse
 Apocrypha – The Eyes of Time
 Artch – Another Return (to Church Hill)
 Armored Saint – Saints Will Conquer (live)
 Atrophy – Socialized Hate
 Attacker – Second Coming
 At War – Retaliatory Strike
 Barren Cross – Atomic Arena
 Battle Bratt – Battle Bratt
 Bathory – Blood Fire Death
 Jason Becker – Perpetual Burn
 Beowülf – Lost My Head... But I'm Back on the Right Track
 Black 'n Blue – In Heat
 Blind Guardian – Battalions of Fear
 Blind Illusion – The Sane Asylum
 Bloodgood – Rock in a Hard Place
 Bloodlust – Terminal Velocity (EP)
 Bolt Thrower – In Battle There Is No Law
 Bon Jovi – New Jersey
 Brainfever – You (EP)
 Britny Fox – Britny Fox
 Britton – Rock Hard
 Brocas Helm – Black Death
 Bullet Boys – Bullet Boys
 Cacophony – Go Off!
 Candlemass – Ancient Dreams
 Carcass – Reek of Putrefaction
 Celtic Frost – Cold Lake
 China – China
 Chyld – Conception
 Chrome Molly – Angst
 Cinderella – Long Cold Winter
 Cloven Hoof – Dominator
 Coroner – Punishment for Decadence
 Crimson Glory – Transcendence
 Cryptic Slaughter – Stream of Consciousness
 Danzig – Danzig
 Dark Lord – It's Nigh' Time
 D.C. Lacroix – Livin' by the Sword
 Deadly Blessing – Ascend from the Cauldron
 Death – Leprosy
 Death Angel – Frolic Through the Park
 Despair – History of Hate
 Destiny – Atomic Winter
 Destruction – Release from Agony
 Paul Di'Anno's Battlezone – Warchild (comp)
 Dirty Blonde – Dirty Blonde (EP)
 Dirty Looks  – Cool from the Wire
 Dokken – Beast from the East (live)
 D.R.I. – 4 of a Kind
 Drive – Characters in Time
 Earthshaker – Smash
 Europe – Out of this World
 Exciter – Exciter, a.k.a. O.T.T.
 Fastway – On Target
 Fates Warning – No Exit
 Femme Fatale – Femme Fatale
 Flotsam and Jetsam – No Place for Disgrace
 Lita Ford – Lita
 Frehley's Comet – Live+1 (EP)
 Frehley's Comet – Second Sighting
 Marty Friedman – Dragon's Kiss
 Forbidden – Forbidden Evil
 Gargoyle – Gargoyle
 Genocide (Jap) – Black Sanctuary
 Girlschool – Take a Bite
 Grinder – Dawn for the Living
 Guns N' Roses – GN'R Lies
 Gwar – Hell-O
 Hades – If at First You Don’t Succeed...
 Hellion – Postcards from the Asylum (EP)
 Helloween – Keeper of the Seven Keys Part 2
 Helstar – A Distant Thunder
 Hexx – Quest for Sanity (EP)
 Hittman – Hittman
 Hobbs' Angel of Death – Hobbs' Angel of Death
 Holocross – Holocross
 Holy Terror  – Mind Wars
 House of Lords – House of Lords
 Greg Howe – Greg Howe
 Hydra Vein – Rather Death Than False of Faith
 Impellitteri – Stand in Line
 Iron Maiden – Seventh Son of a Seventh Son
 Jane's Addiction – Nothing's Shocking
 Jetboy – Feel the Shake
 Judas Priest – Ram It Down
 Killer Dwarfs – Big Deal
 King Diamond – Them
 King Kobra – King Kobra III
 Kingdom Come –  Kingdom Come
 Kingpin – Welcome to Bop City
 King's X – Out of the Silent Planet
 Kiss – Smashes, Thrashes & Hits (comp)
 KIX – Blow My Fuse
 Krokus –  Heart Attack
 Kuni – Lookin' for Action
 L.A. Guns – L.A. Guns
 Liege Lord – Master Control
 Lillian Axe –  Lillian Axe
 Living Colour –  Vivid
 Lord – The Second Coming
 Loudness – Jealousy (EP)
 M-16 – Locked and Loaded
 Magnum – Wings of Heaven
 Yngwie Malmsteen – Odyssey
 Manilla Road – Out of the Abyss
 Manowar – Kings of Metal
 Frank Marino & Mahogany Rush – Double Live
 Masi – Downtown Dreamers
 Meanstreak – Roadkill
 Megadeth – So Far, So Good... So What!
 Mekong Delta – The Music of Erich Zann
 Metal Massacre – Metal Massacre IX (Compilation, various artists)
 Metallica – ...And Justice for All
 Michael W. Smith – I 2 (EYE)
 Ministry – The Land of Rape and Honey
 Vinnie Moore – Time Odyssey
 Motörhead – Nö Sleep at All (live)
 Muro – Telón de Acero
 Napalm Death – From Enslavement to Obliteration
 Nasty Savage – Abstract Reality (EP)
 Neon Cross – Neon Cross
 Nuclear Assault – Survive
 Odin – Fight for Your Life
 OLD – Old Lady Drivers
 Opprobrium – Serpent Temptation (as Incubus)
 Overkill – Under the Influence
 Ozzy Osbourne – No Rest for the Wicked
 Pantera – Power Metal
 Pariah – The Kindred
 Pestilence – Malleus Maleficarum
 Poison – Open Up and Say... Ahh!
 Precious Metal – That Kind of Girl
 Prophet – Cycle of the Moon
 Prowler – Prowling Death Squad (EP)
 Queensrÿche – Operation: Mindcrime
 Quiet Riot – QR
 Racer X – Extreme Volume Live
 Rage – Perfect Man
 Ratt – Reach for the Sky
 Raven – Nothing Exceeds Like Excess
 Razor – Violent Restitution
 Realm – Endless War
 Rigor Mortis – Rigor Mortis
 Riot – Thundersteel
 Risk – The Daily News
 Rock City Angels – Young′s Man Blues
 David Lee Roth – Skyscraper
 Roxx Gang – Things Youve Never Done Before
 Running Wild – Port Royal
 Running Wild – Ready for Boarding (live)
 Sacred Warrior – Rebellion
 Sadus – Illusions
 Saint – Too Late for Living
 Saint Vitus – Mournful Cries
 Samael – Medieval Prophecy (EP)
 Sanctuary – Refuge Denied
 S.A. Slayer – Go for the Throat
 Savage Steel  – Do or Die
 Saxon – Destiny
 Scanner – Hypertrace
 Scorpions – Savage Amusement
 Screamer – Target: Earth
 Seduce – Too Much, Ain't Enough
 Shok Paris – Concrete Killers
 Sieges Even – Life Cycle
 Slayer – South of Heaven
 Sodom – Mortal Way of Live (live)
 Soundgarden – Ultramega OK
 Soundgarden – Fopp (EP)
 Steel Fury – Lesser of Two Evils
 Stone – Stone
 Stryper – In God We Trust
 Suicidal Tendencies – How Will I Laugh Tomorrow When I Can't Even Smile Today
 Suicide Squad – Live It While You Can (EP)
 Sword – Sweet Dreams
 Sye – Winds of Change
 Tankard – The Morning After
 Target – Master Project Genesis
 Testament – The New Order
 Tormentor – Anno Domini
 Toxik – World Circus
 Trust – Live – Paris By Night
 220 Volt – Eye to Eye
 Tyrant (Ger) – Ruling the World
 The Unsane – Inverted Crosses (EP)
 V2 – V2
 Van Halen – OU812
 Vendetta (Ger) – Brain Damage
 Vengeance Rising – Human Sacrifice
 Vicious Rumors – Digital Dictator
 Victory – That's Live
 Vinnie Vincent Invasion – All Systems Go
 Vio-lence – Eternal Nightmare
 Virgin Steele – Age of Consent
 Vixen – Vixen
 Voivod – Dimension Hatröss
 Vow Wow – Vibe, a.k.a. Helter Skelter
 VXN – The Question
 Wargasm – Why Play Around?
 Winger – Winger
 Wrathchild – The Biz Suxx
 X Japan – Vanishing Vision
 Zed Yago – From Over Yonder
 Zero Nine – Voodoo You
 Znöwhite – Act of God
 Zodiac Mindwarp – Tattooed Beat Messiah

Disbandments 
 Warlock

Events 
 Living Colour's debut album Vivid peaks at #6 on the Billboard 200, due to the success of the Top 20 single "Cult of Personality". The album is certified platinum twice.
 The Monsters of Rock tour plays across the U.S., featuring Metallica, Van Halen, Scorpions, Dokken, and Kingdom Come.
 Kai Hansen leaves Helloween due to conflict within the band and troubles with the record company. He later forms the band Gamma Ray.
 The Decline of Western Civilization II: The Metal Years is released.
 Mötley Crüe enter rehab.
 Billy Sheehan leaves David Lee Roth's solo band and forms Mr. Big, along with Racer X guitarist Paul Gilbert, vocalist Eric Martin and drummer Pat Torpey.
 Suicidal Tendencies sign to Epic Records and release their highly successful third album How Will I Laugh Tomorrow When I Can't Even Smile Today, featuring one of their famous songs "Trip at the Brain", which earned airplay on radio stations and MTV.
 Glacier release their four-song EP on cassette, featuring guest vocalist, Tim Lachman of fellow Portland band, Gargoyle.  His younger brother, Pat Lachman, later played guitar in Halford and was lead vocalist for Damageplan with Dimebag Darrell and Vinnie Paul, both formerly of Pantera.
 Chuck Mosley is fired from Faith No More and is replaced by Mr. Bungle vocalist Mike Patton.

1980s in heavy metal music
Metal